Comme Chez Soi is a restaurant in Brussels, Belgium.  The chef is Lionel Rigolet, Gault Millau's Belgian Chef of the Year 2007.

For 27 years (as of 1979), it was rated with 3 stars by the Michelin Red Guide.  In 2006 it was downgraded to two stars after chef and owner Pierre Wynants announced he would step down in favour of his son-in-law Rigolet. In 2022, Comme chez Soi lost another star, currently rated with one Michelin star.

The restaurant was founded in 1926 by Georges Cuvelier, originally a coal miner from the Belgian Borinage region. In the 1930s, it moved to its present location, an art nouveau house at Place Rouppe in Brussels, where it obtained its first Michelin star in 1953.

Generations of chefs

 Georges Cuvelier
 Louis Wynants, Cuvelier's son-in-law
 Pierre Wynants
 Lionel Rigolet

Michelin Stars

 1953: one star (Cuvelier)
 1966: two stars (Louis Wynants)
 1979: three stars (Pierre Wynants)
 2006: two stars (Lionel Rigolet)

Trivia

The restaurant's name translates as "just like home". The name came about in its early years, when a patron told Cuvelier by way of compliment "Georges, in your restaurant one eats like at home". Up to then, the restaurant had simply been called "Chez Georges".

Notes

External links
Official Website

Restaurants in Brussels
Michelin Guide starred restaurants in Belgium
Art Nouveau architecture in Brussels
Art Nouveau houses
Art Nouveau restaurants